Conci is an Italian surname. Notable people with the surname include:
 Elisabetta Conci (1895–1965), Italian politician
 Nicola Conci (born 1997), Italian cyclist

Italian-language surnames
Surnames of South Tyrolean origin